Music to Listen to~Dance to~Blaze to~Pray to~Feed to~Sleep to~Talk to~Grind to~Trip to~Breathe to~Help to~Hurt to~Scroll to~Roll to~Love to~Hate to~Learn Too~Plot to~Play to~Be to~Feel to~Breed to~Sweat to~Dream to~Hide to~Live to~Die to~Go To (often abbreviated to Music to Listen To... or ~Go To~) is a commercial release by British rock band Bring Me the Horizon. It was released on 27 December 2019 without prior announcement. The release was produced by the band's vocalist Oliver Sykes and keyboardist Jordan Fish, and features collaborations with several artists including American singer Halsey and British band Yonaka.

Music to Listen To... is the longest musical project by Bring Me the Horizon, and has been referred to as both an extended play and an album by varying sources. The project originated as an idea to use elements from the band's 2019 album Amo and demos they had previously recorded.

Background
Despite being longer than any of the band's studio albums, Music to Listen To... is being marketed as an EP, though other sources have referred to it as an album. The release comes shortly after an interview with vocalist Oliver Sykes in which he discussed plans for more experimental releases, stating "We're not going to do an album again, maybe ever." It was left unannounced until the day of its release, with the band posting "new record out now" on their social media.

Music to Listen To... signalled a continuation of the more collaborative direction explored on Amo, the latter of which included features from Grimes and Dani Filth. Pop singer Halsey is a guest vocalist on the song "¿", who Sykes and Fish had met when producing her own song "Experiment on Me" for the Birds of Prey film soundtrack. Other featured artists include previous touring mates Yonaka and Lotus Eater, as well as indie pop outfit Happyalone and hip hop artist Bexey.

Describing the process behind the release, Sykes said his first idea was to make "a bit of a study album, or something long, using bits and bobs from what we've got from Amo or demos and stuff like that. When we got together it turned into this whole different thing, and we just rolled with it."

Composition

Influences, style and themes
In a major departure from the band's previous works, Music to Listen To... largely eschews the use of guitars and traditional song structures. Its style has been described as electropop, electronica, ambient, experimental, and industrial.

Recording and repurposing
Much of the material on Music to Listen To... was conceived of during the sessions for Amo. Several songs reference or sample material from that album: "Steal Something." contains elements of "I Apologise If You Feel Something", "¿" interpolates lyrics from "In the Dark", and "Why You Gotta Kick Me When I'm Down?" samples portions of "A Devastating Liberation". Sputnikmusic's Simon K. referred to the project as "Essentially [...] a remix EP".

"¿" also features "one of the first things Jordan [Fish] ever wrote for the band", a lead sound used on the Sempiternal track "Can You Feel My Heart". The group sent a demo for the song to Halsey, who wrote her own lyrics and recorded vocals. Sykes and Fish then reworked the song around her performance. Sykes' monologue in "Underground Big {HEADFULOFHYENA}" was recorded with Fish and mixing engineer Dan Lancaster. Sykes was "stoned" and talking with the others when the computer they were recording on crashed, causing the instrumental to create a "hypnotic" loop for several minutes that Sykes recorded over.

Critical reception

Music to Listen To... received polarised reviews from critics. Some praised its experimentation, whilst others were less keen on the stylistic pivot and criticised its length.

In a four-star review for NME, Ali Shutler called the release a "bold experiment" and described it as an "intense, occasionally confusing listen that definitely won't be for everyone, but [...] never feels like hard work". A less positive review from Sputnikmusic's Simon K. called the album "devoid of compositional structure, narrative and flow" and summarised it as a "drunken joke the band may well regret". AllMusic also criticised the release, stating that "as the tracks bleed one into the next, there isn't much here to grasp onto, outside of big moments that suddenly swell up and devour listeners".

Track listing

Notes
 "Like Seeing Spiders Running Riot on Your Lover's Grave" is stylised in all lowercase and in quotation marks.
 "Dead Dolphin Sounds 'Aid Brain Growth in Unborn Child' Virtual Therapy / Nature Healing 2 Hours" is stylised as "Dead Dolphin Sounds 'aid brain growth in unborn child' Virtual Therapy / Nature Healing 2 Hours".
 "Tapes" is stylised as "±ªþ³§".

Personnel
Credits adapted from Tidal.

Bring Me the Horizon

 Oliver Sykes – lead vocals , production, engineering, recording
 Jordan Fish – programming , background vocals , production, engineering, recording
 Lee Malia – guitar 
 Matt Kean
 Matt Nicholls

Additional musicians

 Simon Dobson – trumpet , fluegelhorn 
 William Harvey – viola , violin 
 Gavin Kibble – cello 
 Madilyn Eve Cutter – cello 
 Max Ruisi – cello 
 Rachael Lander – cello 
 Alexander Verster – double bass 
 Jessica Price – double bass 
 Lewis Reid – double bass 
 Oliver Hickie – French horn 
 Jane Salmon – trombone 
 Ross Anderson – trombone 
 Victoria Rule – trumpet 
 Anisa Arslanagic – viola 
 Benjamin Kaminski – viola 
 Mark Gibbs – viola 
 Agata Daraskaite – violin 
 Elena Abad – violin 
 Francesca Gilbert – violin 
 James Toll – violin 
 Kirsty Mangan – violin 
 Magdalena Loth-Hill – violin 
 Naomi Burrell – violin 
 Olivia Daisy Holland – violin 
 Halsey – vocals 
 Cameron Humphrey – drums 
 Douglas Park – guitar 
 Bexey – vocals 
 Jamie McLees – vocals 
 Fionn Tobin – vocals 
 Toriel – vocals 
 Theresa Jarvis – vocals 

Additional personnel

 Ted Jensen – mastering
 Dan Lancaster – mixing
 Happyalone – additional production 
 Alex Crosby – vocal engineering 
 Rhys May – assistant engineering

Charts

Notes

References

2019 albums
Bring Me the Horizon albums